Arruazu is a town and municipality located in the province and autonomous community of Navarre, northern Spain. As of census  2017, there are 101 inhabitants in the area.

References

External links
 ARRUAZU in the Bernardo Estornés Lasa - Auñamendi Encyclopedia (Euskomedia Fundazioa) 
 

Municipalities in Navarre